LaShawn Ameen Daniels (December 28, 1977 – September 3, 2019) was an American songwriter, vocal producer and arranger known for his songwriting credits on songs by artists such as Brandy, Lady Gaga, Beyoncé, Destiny’s Child, Michael Jackson, Tamar Braxton, Toni Braxton, Jennifer Lopez, Ciara, Whitney Houston and more. As a songwriter and producer, Daniels had received eight Grammy Award nominations, winning one for Best R&B Song for co-writing Destiny's Child's number-one single "Say My Name".

Early life 
Daniels was born in Newark, New Jersey, United States.

Personal life

Daniels married April and together had three sons.

Career 
Daniels won a Grammy Award for Best R&B Song in 2001 for his songwriting work on "Say My Name" by Destiny's Child, and was nominated in the same category in 2014 for "Love and War" performed by Tamar Braxton.

Death
Daniels died on September 3, 2019, at the age of 41, following a car crash in South Carolina.

Songwriting credits
Daniels songs were usually co-written in collaboration with producer Rodney "Darkchild" Jerkins. These include:
 Brandy – "Top of the World" (1998)
 Brandy and Monica – "The Boy Is Mine" (1998)
 Whitney Houston – "It's Not Right but It's Okay" (1999)
 Brandy – "Angel in Disguise" (1999)
 Jennifer Lopez – "If You Had My Love" (1999)
 So Plush featuring Ja Rule – "Damn (Should've Treated U Right)" (1999)
 Destiny's Child – "Say My Name" (1999)
 Brandy – "Never Say Never" (2000)
 Whitney Houston and George Michael – "If I Told You That" (2000)
 Melanie B – "Tell Me" (2000)
 Spice Girls – "Holler" (2000)
 Spice Girls – "Let Love Lead the Way" (2000)
 Toni Braxton – "He Wasn't Man Enough" (2000)
 Michael Jackson – "You Rock My World" (2001)
 Michael Jackson – "Privacy" (2001)
 Michael Jackson – "Heartbreaker" (2001)
 Michael Jackson – "Invincible" (2001)
 Michael Jackson – "Unbreakable" (2001)
 Michael Jackson – "Threatened" (2001)
 Monica – "All Eyez on Me" (2002)
 Brandy – "What About Us? (2002)
 Mary Mary - "He Said" (2002)
 Blaque – "I'm Good" (2004)
 Destiny's Child – "Lose My Breath" (2004)
 Ray J – "One Wish" (2005)
 Ray J – "What I Need" (2006)
 Kierra Sheard – "Why Me?" (2006)
 Ciara featuring 50 Cent – "Can't Leave 'em Alone" (2007)
 Janet Jackson – "Feedback" (2007)
 Natasha Bedingfield – "Angel" (2008)
 Joe – "E.R. (Emergency Room)" (2008)
 Janet Jackson – "Luv" (2008)
 Lady Gaga and Beyoncé – "Telephone" (2010)
 Tamar Braxton – "Love and War" (2012)
 Tamar Braxton – "The One" (2013)
 Tamar Braxton – "Hot Sugar" (2013)
 Michael Jackson – "Xscape" (2014)
 Tamar Braxton – "If I Don't Have You" (2015)
Erica Campbell - “I Luh God” (2015)
Brandy - “Borderline” (2020)

References

External links
 

1977 births
2019 deaths
African-American songwriters
Grammy Award winners
Musicians from Newark, New Jersey
Road incident deaths in South Carolina
Songwriters from New Jersey
20th-century African-American people
21st-century African-American people